Worlds of Fun is an entertainment complex with more than 235 acres located in Kansas City, Missouri. It is the largest amusement park and water park in the Midwest. Founded by American businessmen Lamar Hunt and Jack Steadman, the park opened in 1973 under the ownership of Hunt's company, Mid-America Enterprises. Oceans of Fun is a water park which was added in 1982 and is next to the amusement park. Included in the price of admission to Worlds of Fun is admission to Oceans of Fun. Both parks were sold to Cedar Fair in 1995 for $40 million.

History
Texas and Arkansas native Lamar Hunt brought the Dallas Texans NFL team which he owned to Kansas City, Missouri, in 1963 renaming the franchise the Kansas City Chiefs. He founded an operating company in the region called Mid-America Enterprises, which focused on real estate, mining, and entertainment. Hunt worked with his business partner Jack Steadman to conceptualize and develop Worlds of Fun, which opened on May 26, 1973. It is located at the northern edge of a vast industrial complex in the bluffs above the Missouri River in Clay County, Missouri. At the time it opened, numerous projects across Kansas City were being built, including Kansas City International Airport, Kemper Arena (now called Hy-Vee Arena), and the Truman Sports Complex. Mid-America Enterprises, seeking to capitalize on the citywide expansion movement, began construction on a new amusement park in 1964. The park was originally planned to complement a  hotel and entertainment complex, but a lagging economy during the park's early years derailed the idea.

In 1974, the first addition to Worlds of Fun was the 4000-seat Forum Amphitheater, which opened in the Europa section of the park. In 1976, a new section opened in honor of the United States Bicentennial – the 200th anniversary of the signing of the Declaration of Independence–and was named Bicentennial Square. The new section included the debut of Screamroller from Arrow Dynamics, which was a replica of the first modern-looping roller coaster, Corkscrew, that opened a year earlier at Knott's Berry Farm.

In 1982, Oceans of Fun opened next door as the largest water park in the world. Also the same year, a sub-world "River City" was opened in Americana bordering the Orient section. Screamroller was transformed into Extremeroller the following year, which featured stand-up trains instead of the original sit-down models making it the first looping, stand-up roller coaster in North America. Several years later in 1989, Worlds of Fun ended the decade with the addition of Timber Wolf, a wooden roller coaster that initially ranked high in several national polls.

Cedar Fair LP purchased Worlds of Fun in 1995 for $40 million. The new owners invested $10 million with the addition of Mamba, a D.H. Morgan Manufacturing steel hypercoaster, to the park's attraction lineup in 1998.

Other notable additions
 2006: Patriot opens as the longest, tallest, and fastest full-circuit inverted roller coaster in the region. It was the park's largest capital investment on a single attraction at $14 million.
 2008: For their 35th anniversary, Worlds of Fun added a festival called Oktoberfest.
 2009: A new wooden coaster, Prowler, is added to the Africa section of the park. It receives the Golden Ticket Award for "Best New Ride of 2009" by Amusement Today magazine.
 2010: Snoopy's Hot Summer Lights, a $1 million immersive light and sound experience, opens in the Europa and Africa sections of the park. Subway opens at Oceans of Fun.
 2011:  Planet Snoopy, an $8-million children's themed area, is added to Worlds of Fun, featuring over 20 rides and attractions. An Illions carousel called The Grand Carousel was added to the Scandinavia section of the park.
 2012: A premium line queue system called "Fast Lane" is introduced.
 2013: Oceans of Fun receives full integration with Worlds of Fun, sharing one admission for both parks.
 2014: WindSeeker – a  Mondial swing ride at Knott's Berry Farm – was renamed SteelHawk and relocated to Worlds of Fun for the 2014 season.
2016: Planet Snoopy receives upgrades, including five new rides added to the children's area, with the removal of two former attractions.
 2017: Mustang Runner (HUSS Troika), Falcon's Flight (HUSS Condor) is added to the Americana section of the park. A newly remodeled entrance is introduced, and Winterfest is introduced in November.
 2018: Nordic Chaser (Mack SeaStorm) is added to the Scandinavia section of the park.  Timber Wolf replaced their helix with a new seventy-degree back turn.  Great Coasters International constructed the new element.
 2019: Worlds of Fun added a new flagship restaurant, Cotton Blossom BBQ.  It is 9,000 square feet and seats more than 300 guests.
 2020: Riptide Raceway, the world's longest mat racing slide, was to have opened to the public, but deferred to 2021 on grounds of COVID-19 pandemic.

Areas and attractions
The park takes its theme from the Jules Verne book, Around the World in Eighty Days. Worlds of Fun is divided into eight major sections (Scandinavia, Africa, Europa, the Orient, Wild West, International Plaza, Planet Snoopy, and Americana). Rides, attractions, shops, shows, and restaurants are named according to the area theme. Guests enter the park in International Plaza. In 1997 the Americana "main entrance" was closed for the creation of Grand Prix, so the "back gate" became the "main gate" ever since. The next world to the left is Scandinavia, then Africa, continuing in a clockwise rotation, guests would then enter the Wild West section, then the Americana section, followed by the Orient. The Europa section is located in the approximate center of the circle.

Behind the Wild West section, lies the section of Planet Snoopy (the area of the park specifically for young children). Originally added in 1978 as an expansion of Americana, over the years the grounds have changed its identity several times. Initially it was called "Aerodrome" (1978–86) with futuristic rides for adults, it then became a children's area called "Pandamonium!" (1987–97), then "Berenstain Bear Country" (1997–2000), and "Camp Snoopy" (2001–2010), and is currently "Planet Snoopy", new to the 2011 season. Past sub-sections have also included Bicentennial Square, River City, and Beat Street, which all have been absorbed back into Americana.

Although there is no Australian/Oceanic section in the park, there is an Australian-themed Boomerang roller coaster; it is part of the section named Africa.

Roller coasters

Africa

Americana

Europa

International Plaza

Orient

Planet Snoopy

Scandinavia

Wild West

 + Denotes an extra cost for the ride or attraction.
 * On August 11, 2022, Worlds of Fun announced the Zambezi Zinger II - a new steel and wooden hybrid roller coaster that will have the same location and thrill of the old Zambezi Zinger, but with updates to the design and safety of the ride. The scheduled opening of the Zambezi Zinger II is for the 2023 season, which is the 50th anniversary of the park.

Former rides and attractions

Roller coasters 

Schussboomer, (1973–1984), a ski-themed steel roller coaster with ten separate 4-passenger cars.
Screamroller/Extremeroller , (1976–1988), the first stand-up roller coaster in the Western Hemisphere. Its only season as a stand-up coaster was in 1983, after which it was reverted to the original sit-down style.
Zambezi Zinger, (1973–1997), a steel "Speedracer"-type roller coaster (one of only two in existence at the time of its removal) with an electric spiral lift and a fast-paced ride through the woods. Currently in operation at the Colombian National Coffee Park as Broca Colombia, South America. On August 11, 2022, Worlds of Fun announced the Zambezi Zinger II - a new steel and wooden hybrid roller coaster that will have the same location and thrill of the old Zambezi Zinger, but with updates to the design and safety of the ride.
Orient Express, (1980–2003), the first roller coaster in the world to feature a batwing (then known as a "Kamikaze Curve"), now a common element in thrill rides. Also, it was the second roller coaster in the world to have two interlocking loops.
Silly Serpent/Funicular, (1973-1987) An Allan Herschell Company Little Dipper. The children's coaster was originally located in the Europa section of the park as "Funicular" and moved to the Africa section where it operated as "Silly Serpent" until it was removed in 1987.

Flat rides/attractions 

Barnstormer, (1978-1983), a 100-foot tall spinning airplane ride manufactured by Bradley & Kaye. Added with the opening of the Aerodrome area. Retired in part due to frequent shutdowns due to high winds.
Incred-O-Dome, (1981–1997), an OMNIMAX-style theater where viewers could go on a virtual ride of, among other things, the Orient Express coaster. This appealed to visitors who did not want to wait in line or experience the real ride, as well as those with physical conditions which would prevent them from riding at all.
Omegatron, (1986–2001), a six-story Vekoma Sky Flyer ride, replaced by Thunderhawk.
Python Plunge, (1988-1999) a water-slide type ride where the riders would carry the raft up to the top themselves. There were two types of slides. One slide was open aired and went straight down, the other was a twisting tube.
Grand Prix Raceway, (1997-2014), go-kart racing, replaced by the SteelHawk.
Octopus, (1973-2014) an Eyerly Monster octopus, replaced by the Scandi Scrambler.
Thunderhawk, (2002-2015) a HUSS Top Spin ride that flipped riders several times and took riders to a height of 60 feet.
Krazy Kars, (1973-2015) a children's bumper car ride removed for Mustang Runner.
Le Carousel, (1979-2016) 3 across horse merry-go-round replaced by Falcons Flight
Finnish Fling, (1973-2017) a Chance Rides Rotor, believed to have been one of fewer than six operating Rotors in North America. It was replaced by Nordic Chaser.
Diamond Head, (1982-2019) a water slide complex at Oceans of Fun consisting of three body slides (Honolulu Lulu, Maui Wowie, and Waikiki Wipeout). Replaced by Riptide Raceway.
Ski Heis/Sky Hi, (1973-1987) a Von Roll Skyride
Wobble Wheel, (1977-1993) a Chance Rides Trabant. The Wobble Wheel, an outdoor ride, was enclosed and rebranded as Cyclone Sam's in 1995.

Oceans of Fun

Oceans of Fun is Worlds of Fun's water park. It opened in 1982 as the world's largest water park. It is included with admission to Worlds of Fun, beginning in the 2013 season.

Fast Lane

Fast Lane is Worlds of Fun's "two line" system introduced 2012. For a increased cost  (in addition to normal admission charges), visitors receive a wrist band that enables them to bypass the standby line and enter the "Fast Lane" line to significantly reduce their wait time. Fast Lane Plus gets access to select rides not included in basic Fast Lane.

During Halloween Haunt, a similar system named "Fright Lane" is sold. Serving the same purpose as Fast Lane, it significantly reduces wait time of select haunted attractions. "Fright Lane+" includes a "Skeleton Key", a key that grants holders special access to secret, intense rooms in six of the eight haunted houses. In addition, holders receive special seating for Ed Alonzo's Psycho Circus of Magic and Mayhem. "Fright Lane Max" is a VIP system that allows holders seating at Overlord's Awakening, a meal, limited edition Haunt T-shirts, plus all perks listed above.

Worlds of Fun Village
In 2005 Worlds of Fun opened the first on-site resort. The campground is adjacent to the park, and is located "behind" Mamba. The Village has 22 cabins and 20 cottages and 82 sites for RVs, complete with electric and TV cable hook ups. Each cabin or cottage can fit 6–8 people.

Snoopy's Hot Summer Lights
"Snoopy's Hot Summer Lights", which debuted in 2010, was an immersive light and sound experience starring the Peanuts characters. Snoopy's Hot Summer Lights features over 2 million LED lights and a variety of audio soundtracks through the Africa and Europa sections of the park. Along the walkway there were replicas of Snoopy and other characters for guests to view. Snoopy's Hot Summer Lights was a one million dollar investment that used special effects and sound design, custom designed for Worlds of Fun by Emmy Award-Winning RWS and Associates. Snoopy's Hot Summer Lights opened for its original run on June 4 and ran through September 5, 2010.

Halloween Haunt

Halloween Haunt is a Halloween event that takes place during the Halloween season. It is included in the price of admission.

Current attractions
, it features 11 Extreme Haunts, including six mazes and five scare zones, along with four live shows.

Former Haunt attractions

Games
Cole Lindbergh, former manager of the park's games department, was featured in a 2011 episode of Public Radio International's This American Life, "Amusement Park." In the nine-minute prologue, host Ira Glass interviews Lindbergh about his management philosophy and plays segments from several YouTube videos he made to promote the park's games.

Gallery

Incidents

Barnstormer 

 In July 1978, during the ride's first season of operation, a malfunction of the 100-foot-tall Barnstormer caused the spinning planes carrying riders to descend rapidly, hitting each other on the way down. Some riders were also sprayed with hydraulic fluid. In total, 20 riders suffered minor injuries.

Oceans of Fun 

 On August 24, 2019 a 14-year-old boy drowned in the wave pool. The boy died in the hospital after being taken off life support due to loss of brain function.

Orient Express 

 On June 14, 1987, a train that was pulling into the loading station malfunctioned and slammed into the rear of the other train inside of the roller coaster station. A total of 56 passengers were involved in the accident, but only 8 were taken to the hospital for injuries.
 On July 17, 1999, two cars of a seven-car train derailed due to severe internal metal fatigue in a support post, stranding 18 people. Two were immediately taken to a hospital, and six went later. None of the injuries were life-threatening.

Screamroller 

 On May 18, 1976, Robbie M. Meyers, an 8-year-old boy, was struck and seriously injured by the Screamroller after entering a restricted area. In 1977, Meyers was awarded $ (equivalent to $ in ) in a lawsuit finding Mid-America Enterprises responsible for his injuries.

Timber Wolf 

 On March 31, 1990, two trains collided just short of the loading platform, injuring 35 people. The control system had malfunctioned and was unable to control two trains at once. The ride reopened with a single train until the control system was fixed to handle two.
 On June 30, 1995, a 14-year-old girl fell from her seat on the coaster and died. The park owner at the time, Hunt-Midwest Entertainment Inc., and ride manufacturer, Dinn Corporation, claimed that she was switching seats when the accident occurred. A riding companion claimed that safety restraints (a lap bar and seat belt) had come undone on a sharp turn at the top of one of the ride's hills. But, Worlds of Fun officials claimed that witnesses had seen her remove her restraints and tried to switch seats and that there had been no malfunction, though her family disputed this. The ride was temporarily closed pending an investigation of its safety features, which resulted in new lap bar installations. Hunt-Midwest Entertainment Inc. and Dinn Corporation settled with the family for $200,000. This makes the Timber Wolf the only ride so far at Worlds of Fun with a fatality.
 On August 2, 2014, an 11-year-old boy was taken to a hospital after suffering a concussion and a bloody nose on the ride. The boy said that as the coaster was descending down the hill, he hit his head and nose on the restraint and therefore had a bloody nose as he was exiting the ride. He had blood all over his shorts according to authorities. Paramedics wrapped the boy's nose with a towel to prevent blood from dripping on his legs and feet .

In popular culture
Worlds of Fun was used as the setting for a skit in a 2021 episode of Saturday Night Live. The skit opens with a still photo of the park's iconic hot-air balloon sign and then cuts to the cast getting ready to ride Viking Voyager. The park's logo can be seen in the sketch and other rides such as Mamba and Zulu are referenced as well.

It also appears in the HBO series The Last of Us.

See also

 Closed rides and attractions at Worlds of Fun
 Incidents at Worlds of Fun

References

External links

 Worlds of Fun official website
 

 
Amusement parks in Missouri
Cedar Fair amusement parks
1973 establishments in Missouri
Tourist attractions in Kansas City, Missouri
Buildings and structures in Kansas City, Missouri
Amusement parks opened in 1973